Dry Creek is a common name for streams in Oregon.  The Geographic Names Information System list 96 streams by that name.  The National Hydrography Dataset contains 91 of those streams. Nine of them are over 15 miles in length, they are listed below.

References

Rivers of Oregon